The 2002 European Curling Championships were held in Grindelwald, Switzerland December 5–14.

Men's

A tournament

Final round robin standings

Playoffs

Semifinals
December 13th, 20:00

Bronze-medal game
December 14th, 14:00

Gold-medal game
December 14th, 14:00

Medals

Women's

A tournament

Final round robin standings

Playoffs

Semifinals
December 13th, 16:00

Bronze-medal game
December 14th, 10:00

Gold-medal game
December 14th, 10:00

Medals

References
Men: 
Women: 

European Curling Championships
Curling Championships
European Curling Championships
Curling
Curling competitions in Switzerland
2002 in European sport

no:Curling-EM 2003